Imad Youkhana Yaqo (Arabic: عماد يوخنا) is an Assyrian member of the Iraqi parliament since 2010, as part of the Assyrian Democratic Movement. He was first elected in the 2010 Iraqi parliamentary election, representing the governorate of Duhok. The elections were historic as it was the first time the parliamentary elections had reserved seats for the Assyrian minority. In 2014, Imad was not elected, however fellow-party member Sargon Lazar gave his winning Kirkuk seat to him, securing Imad another 4 years in the parliament. He will be running for reelections on 12 May 2018. Imad speaks Assyrian, Arabic, Turkmani, Kurdish and English. He received Bachelor's in Agriculture from the University of Baghdad in 1990.

As Deputy Secretary-General, Imad the second high-level official within ADM as of 2018.

References

1966 births
Living people
Assyrian Democratic Movement politicians
People from Duhok
University of Baghdad alumni